Druce Lake is a lake in Lake County, Illinois in the U.S. state found at an elevation of .

Druce Lake bears the name of Alexander Druce. A community called Druce Lake also lies nearby.

See also
List of lakes in Illinois

References

Lakes of Lake County, Illinois
Lakes of Illinois